Campbell Mustafa Ağa, also known as Ingliz Mustafa was a Scotsman who from 1775 was the chief instructor in the new Ottoman Empire naval mathematical academy, the Hendishâne, succeeding François Baron de Tott. He later converted to Shia Islam.

References

Bibliography
 Christopher Ferrard: "İngiliz Mustafa: A Scotsman in the service of the Ottoman Empire“ in Yücel Dağlı Anısına, Turkuaz Yayınları, 2016

Converts to Islam
Scottish expatriates in Turkey